Local elections were held in the Province of Laguna on May 13, 2013 as part of the 2013 general election. Voters elected candidates for all local positions: a municipal/city mayor, vice mayor and town councilors, as well as members of the Sangguniang Panlalawigan, the vice-governor, governor and representatives for the four districts of Laguna.

Candidates

Provincial elections

Partial Unofficial results from COMELEC 
Partial Unofficial Tally as of 2013-05-24 09:17:41

Gubernatorial election
E.R. Ejercito is the incumbent, incumbent 4th district Rep. Edgar San Luis is his primary opponent.

Vice-gubernatorial election
Caesar Perez is the incumbent and is running for Mayor of Los Baños, Laguna. Former Vice Governor Ramil Hernandez running this place his opponent is Celso Mercado and Incumbent Councilor of San Pablo City and PCL Laguna  President Dante Amante the brother of Incumbent Mayor Vicente Amante.

Congressional elections

1st District
Danilo Fernandez is the incumbent.

2nd District
Incumbent Timmy Chipeco is term limited; his father, Calamba mayor Jun Chipeco, Jr., is his party's nominee. His opponent is former governor Teresita Lazaro.

3rd District
Maria Evita Arago is the incumbent for her 3rd and last term. She will oppose former ABS-CBN News anchor/reporter Sol Aragones and campaign coordinator and former Vice Mayor of San Pablo City Laguna Celia Counducto-Lopez.

4th District
Incumbent Edgar San Luis is running for governor. His party, the Liberal Party, nominates former Rep. Benjamin Agarao Jr.

Provincial Board elections
All 4 Districts of Laguna will elect Sangguniang Panlalawigan or provincial board members.

1st District
Cities: Biñan, Santa Rosa City, San Pedro City
Parties are as stated in their certificate of candidacies.

|-

|-

2nd District
Cities: Cabuyao, Calamba
Municipality: Bay, Los Baños
Parties are as stated in their certificate of candidacies.

|-

|-

3rd District
Cities: San Pablo City
Municipality: Alaminos, Calauan, Liliw. Nagcarlan, Rizal, Victoria
Parties are as stated in their certificate of candidacies.

|-

|-

4th District
Municipalities: Cavinti, Famy, Kalayaan, Luisiana, Lumban, Mabitac, Magdalena, Majayjay, Paete, Pagsanjan, Pakil, Pangil, Pila, Santa Cruz, Santa Maria, Siniloan
Parties are as stated in their certificate of candidacies.

|-

|-

City and municipal elections
All municipalities of Laguna, Biñan, Cabuyao, Calamba, San Pablo City, and Santa Rosa City will elect mayor and vice-mayor this election. The candidates for mayor and vice mayor with the highest number of votes wins the seat; they are voted separately, therefore, they may be of different parties when elected. Below is the list of mayoralty candidates of each city and municipalities per district.

1st District
Cities: Biñan, Santa Rosa City, San Pedro City

Biñan

Santa Rosa

San Pedro City

2nd District
Cities: Cabuyao, Calamba
Municipality: Bay, Los Baños

Cabuyao

Calamba

Bay

Los Baños
In a bid for the mayoralty, Incumbent Vice Governor Caesar Perez faces off against Incumbent Mayor Anthony Genuino, Former Mayor Francisco Lapis, Marcelino de Guzman and Juan Leron

3rd District
City: San Pablo City
Municipality: Alaminos, Calauan, Liliw. Nagcarlan, Rizal, Victoria

San Pablo

Incumbent Vicente Amante his term-limited his son City Administrator Lorento Amante running for Mayor his opponents is Former City Administrator and Vice Mayor Atty. Hizon Arago, Incumbent Councilor Angelo Adriano and Former Mayor and Congressman in 3rd district Florante Aquino.

Alaminos

Calauan

Liliw

Nagcarlan

Rizal

Victoria

4th District
Municipality: Cavinti, Famy, Kalayaan, Luisiana, Lumban, Mabitac, Magdalena, Majayjay, Laguna, Paete, Pagsanjan, Pakil, Pangil, Pila, Santa Cruz, Santa Maria, Siniloan

Cavinti

Famy

Kalayaan

Luisiana

Lumban

Mabitac

Magdalena

Majayjay

Paete

Pagsanjan

Pakil

Pangil

Pila

Santa Cruz
Incumbent Mayor Domingo Panganiban seeks for reelection against Councilor Ramon Tan and Former Mayor Ariel Magcalas

Santa Maria

Siniloan

Aftermath
In September 2013, the Commission on Elections ruled that Ejercito was disqualified for overspending during the election, later in May 2014, the En Banc of COMELEC ordered Ejercito to step down from office, but the latter appealed on the Supreme Court to null the COMELEC decision. On May 27, 2014, Ramil Hernandez assumed as Governor of Laguna, while Board Member Atty. Katherine "Karen" Agapay of the 3rd District assumed as Vice Governor. Three days later, Ejercito's uncle, Manila Mayor Joseph Estrada convinced his nephew to step down at the capitol.

References

2013 Philippine local elections
Elections in Laguna (province)
2013 elections in Calabarzon